Ilerdopteryx is an extinct genus of birds, perhaps an enantiornithine, from the Lower Cretaceous La Pedrera de Rúbies Formation lithographic limestone of Spain. The type species, I. viai, is known only from a collection of isolated contour feathers.

References

Bird genera
Cretaceous birds of Europe
Prehistoric birds of Europe
Fossil taxa described in 1985